Lauren Brooke is the pen name of popular author Linda Chapman and Beth Chambers who have written the books for "Heartland".  Beth Chambers went on to write the series "Chestnut Hill" which Cathy Hapka also contributed toward.

In 2007, Heartland was adapted into a television series which began airing on CBC Television in Canada.

Selected works
 Heartland (novel series)
 Chestnut Hill (novel series)

References 

Living people
English women novelists
English children's writers
British women children's writers
20th-century English writers
21st-century English writers
20th-century English women writers
21st-century English women writers
Year of birth missing (living people)
Place of birth missing (living people)